Barringtonia racemosa (powder-puff tree, Malay: Putat) is a tree in the family Lecythidaceae. It is found in coastal swamp forests and on the edges of estuaries in the Indian Ocean, starting at the east coast of Mozambique and KwaZulu-Natal (South Africa) to Madagascar, India, Sri Lanka, Malaysia, Maldives, Thailand, Laos, southern China, northern Australia, coastal Taiwan, the Ryukyu Islands and many Polynesian islands.

The 1889 book 'The Useful Native Plants of Australia’ records that the Indigenous people of the Mitchell River District called this plant "Yakooro" and that "The root of this tree has a bitter taste, and is used by Hindoo [sic.] practitioners on account of its aperient and cooling qualities. The seeds and bark are also used in native medicine; the latter is of a reddish colour, and is said to possess properties allied to the Cinchonas. The pulverised fruit is used as snuff, and, combined with other remedies, is applied externally in diseases of the skin. (Treasury of Botany)."

The Powder-puff tree is a protected tree in South Africa.

Gallery

See also
List of Southern African indigenous trees

References 

Notes
.

External links

racemosa
Flora of Africa
Flora of tropical Asia
Flora of Australia
Protected trees of South Africa